Luzino is a PKP railway station in Luzino (Pomeranian Voivodeship), Poland.

Lines crossing the station

Train services
The station is served by the following services:

Regional services (R) Tczew — Słupsk  
Regional services (R) Malbork — Słupsk  
Regional services (R) Elbląg — Słupsk  
Regional services (R) Słupsk — Bydgoszcz Główna 
Regional services (R) Luzino — Gdynia Główna
Regional services (R) Słupsk — Gdynia Główna

Szybka Kolej Miejska services (SKM) (Lebork -) Wejherowo - Reda - Rumia - Gdynia - Sopot - Gdansk

References 

Luzino article at Polish Stations Database, URL accessed at 18 March 2006

Railway stations in Pomeranian Voivodeship
Wejherowo County